Ralph Peter Goldston (February 25, 1929 – July 9, 2011) was a running back and defensive back in the Canadian Football League who played nine seasons for the Hamilton Tiger-Cats. He helped the Tiger-Cats to two Grey Cup wins in 1957 and 1963. He was a 4 time all-star with the Ti-Cats, intercepting 32 passes and returning them for 416 yards. Goldston finished his career with the Montreal Alouettes in 1965. He was selected in the 1952 NFL Draft by the Philadelphia Eagles and he played four seasons for the Eagles. After retiring as an active player, Goldston spent 30 years as a college coach (Harvard and Colorado) and finally a scout for the Seattle Seahawks.

Goldston died on July 9, 2011 in Columbus, OH.

External links 
Bio

1929 births
2011 deaths
American football running backs
American players of Canadian football
Canadian football defensive backs
Canadian football running backs
Hamilton Tiger-Cats players
Montreal Alouettes players
Philadelphia Eagles players
Youngstown State Penguins football players
People from Campbell, Ohio